Alex Davani (born 17 August 1985) in Papua New Guinea is a footballer who plays as a midfielder. He has played for Brisbane Strikers FC and Taringa Rovers. He currently plays for Brisbane City in the Brisbane Premier League and the Papua New Guinea national football team.

References 

1985 births
Living people
Papua New Guinean footballers
Papua New Guinea international footballers
Association football midfielders
Papua New Guinean expatriate footballers
Brisbane City FC players
Brisbane Strikers FC players
Papua New Guinean expatriate sportspeople in Australia
Expatriate soccer players in Australia